Xuzhou is a modern prefecture-level city in Jiangsu, China. 

Xuzhou may also refer to:
 Yibin, formerly known as Xuzhou
 Xuzhou District, subdivision of Yibin
 Xuzhou, Zitong County, town in Zitong County, Sichuan

Historical locations
Xuzhou (ancient China), one of the Nine Provinces in ancient China
Xu Prefecture (Jiangsu), a prefecture between the 5th and 18th centuries in modern Jiangsu
Xu Prefecture (Henan), a prefecture between the 6th and 20th centuries in modern Henan
Xu Prefecture (Sichuan), a prefecture under the Ming and Qing dynasties in modern Sichuan

See also
 Suzhou (disambiguation)
 Suchow (disambiguation)